The Chase Grain Elevator is a grain elevator located in Sun Prairie, Wisconsin. It was built in 1922 and added to the National Register of Historic Places in 2010. It is the last known tile elevator remaining in Wisconsin.

History 
Chase Grain Elevator was constructed in 1922 on the site of a previous Chase & Sons elevator that burned down in the winter of 1921–22. The fireproof tile elevator was planned to have a capacity of 13,500 bushels. In March 1922, it was expected to cost $20,000 ( today).

The elevator is said to illustrate experimental construction techniques during the transition from between wood and concrete elevators. Tile elevator construction ended around 1925.

The elevator consists of two cylindrical grain bins, with a third "pocket" bin created from a semi-circle of tile linking the two main bins.

References 

Buildings and structures in Dane County, Wisconsin
Grain elevators in the United States
Agricultural buildings and structures on the National Register of Historic Places in Wisconsin
Industrial buildings completed in 1922
Agricultural buildings and structures in Wisconsin
National Register of Historic Places in Dane County, Wisconsin